The 1906–07 İstanbul Football League season was the third season of the league. Cadi-Keuy FC won the league for the second time.

Season

Matches
 November 1906 Moda FC 5 - Cadi-Keuy FC 0
 November 1906 Galatasaray - Moda FC: 1-1
 December 1906 HMS Imogene FC - Moda FC: 3-1
 December 1906 Elpis FC 0 - Cadi-Keuy FC 4

References

 1906-1907 İstanbul Futbol Ligi. Türk Futbol Tarihi vol.1. page(29). (June 1992) Türkiye Futbol Federasyonu Yayınları. Original Source: "The Levant Herald Newspaper"
 Şenol, Mehmet. A letter dated November 12, 1906, from Emin Bülent Serdaroğlu to Ali Sami Yen. Galatasaray Magazine, March 2011, page 66-69.
 Şenol, Mehmet. A letter dated December 9, 1906, from Asım Tevfik Sonumut to Ali Sami Yen. Galatasaray Magazine, June–July 2011, page 84.

Istanbul Football League seasons
Istanbul
Istanbul